Ryczów  is a village in the administrative district of Gmina Ogrodzieniec, within Zawiercie County, Silesian Voivodeship, in southern Poland.

There are ruins of medieval tower (castle) abandoned in the 15th century and in decay ever since.

References

Villages in Zawiercie County